Lorane is an unincorporated community in Etna-Troy Township, Whitley County, in the U.S. state of Indiana.

History
The community used to have three different names before the present-day name of Lorane. It was first called Steam Corners, so named after its steam-operated sawmills. It also used to be called Glory, so named after a legend about a local traveler who "went through Glory" after crossing a stream and seeing beautiful scenery. The community also had the name Buzzards Glory at one point. The present day name of Lorane was likely named after Lorraine, in France.

A post office was established at Lorane in 1851, and remained in operation until it was discontinued in 1904.

Geography

References

Unincorporated communities in Whitley County, Indiana
Unincorporated communities in Indiana